Arlot may refer to:

 17893 Arlot, a minor planet named after French astronomer Jean-Eudes Arlot
 Variant name of Herleva, mother of William the Conqueror